The Journal of Planning History is a quarterly peer-reviewed academic journal that covers the field of history of city planning. The journal's editors-in-chief are Brent D. Ryan (Massachusetts Institute of Technology) and Sanjeev Vidyarthi (University of Illinois Chicago). It was established in 2002 and is published by SAGE Publications on behalf of the Society for American City and Regional Planning History.

Abstracting and indexing
The journal is abstracted and indexed in:
 America: History and Life
 Academic Search
 CSA Worldwide Political Science Abstracts
 GEOBASE
 Historical Abstracts
 Scopus
 Sociological Abstracts

External links

SAGE Publishing academic journals
English-language journals
Urban studies and planning journals
Quarterly journals
Publications established in 2002